Nikos Xylouris (born 5 April 1982) is a Greek swimmer who competed in the 2004 Summer Olympics and in the 2008 Summer Olympics.

References

1982 births
Living people
Greek male swimmers
Greek male freestyle swimmers
Olympic swimmers of Greece
Swimmers at the 2004 Summer Olympics
Swimmers at the 2008 Summer Olympics
European Aquatics Championships medalists in swimming
Mediterranean Games gold medalists for Greece
Mediterranean Games medalists in swimming
Swimmers at the 2001 Mediterranean Games
Swimmers from Athens
21st-century Greek people